The Secret of Women is an upcoming Indian Malayalam-language emotional thriller drama film written and directed by Prajesh Sen. The sources says it portrays the story of two women It stars Niranjana Anoop, Johny Antony Srikant Murali, Midhun AE etc. The name of the second woman heroine is yet to be announced. The newcomer Anil Krishna is the music director of this movie where as Bijibal is doing the background score.

Cast
Niranjana Anoop
Johny Antony 
Srikant Murali
Midhun AE

References

Upcoming Malayalam-language films
Indian thriller drama films